This list of University of Florida honorary degree recipients includes notable persons who have been recognized by the University of Florida for outstanding achievements in their fields that reflect the ideals and uphold the purposes of the university, and to whom the university faculty has voted to award honorary degrees in recognition of such attainments.  Often, but not always, the honorary degree recipients have been alumni of the university, or have had ties to either the university or the state of Florida.

The University of Florida awarded its first honorary degree in 1909 to Andrew Sledd, in recognition of his four years of service as the founding president of the modern University of Florida.  The first woman to whom the university awarded an honorary degree was Florida author and novelist Marjorie Kinnan Rawlings in 1941.

Honorary degree recipients, 1909–25

Honorary degree recipients, 1926–50

Honorary degree recipients, 1951–75

Honorary degree recipients, 1976–2000

Honorary degree recipients, 2001–present

Key to degree abbreviations

Honorary degrees 

D.C.L. – Doctor of Civil Law
D.D. – Doctor of Divinity
D.F.A. – Doctor of Fine Arts
D.H.L. – Doctor of Humane Letters
D.Litt. – Doctor of Letters
D.P.A. – Doctor of Public Administration
D.P.S. – Doctor of Public Service
D.Sc. – Doctor of Science
L.H.D. – Doctor of Humane Letters
LL.D. – Doctor of Laws
Mus.D. – Doctor of Music

Earned degrees 

B.A. – Bachelor of Arts
B.S. – Bachelor of Science
J.D. – Juris Doctor (professional law degree; replaced LL.B.)
LL.B. – Bachelor of Laws (former law degree; superseded by J.D.)
M.A. – Master of Arts
M.S. – Master of Science
Ph.D. – Doctor of Philosophy (terminal graduate research degree in most disciplines)

See also 

 Florida Gators
 History of Florida
 History of the University of Florida
 List of University of Florida alumni
 List of University of Florida faculty and administrators
 List of University of Florida presidents

References

Bibliography 

Pleasants, Julian M., Gator Tales: An Oral History of the University of Florida, University of Florida, Gainesville, Florida (2006).  
Proctor, Samuel, & Wright Langley, Gator History: A Pictorial History of the University of Florida, South Star Publishing Company, Gainesville, Florida (1986).  .
Van Ness, Carl, & Kevin McCarthy, Honoring the Past, Shaping the Future: The University of Florida, 1853–2003, University of Florida, Gainesville, Florida (2003).

External links 
 University of Florida Honors & Awards 
 University of Florida Honorary Degree Recipients

Honorary degree recipients
Florida University